Penry Williams (5 September 1866 – 26 June 1945) was a Liberal Party politician in England.  He was born in Middlesbrough, the son of Edward Williams, a Cleveland ironmaster.  He was a brother of Aneurin Williams MP.

He was elected at the January 1910 general election as the Member of Parliament for the usually Liberal Middlesbrough constituency in the North Riding of Yorkshire. When the constituency was divided at the 1918 general election, he was elected for the new Middlesbrough East constituency, but was defeated at the 1922 general election by the Conservative Party candidate John Wesley Brown.

With rifts in the Liberal Party healed, the party's fortunes recovered at the 1923 general election, and Williams regained his seat.  His return was short-lived, because at the 1924 general election he was unseated in a close three-way contest by the Labour Party candidate Ellen Wilkinson.
At the 1929 general election, he stood as the Liberal Party candidate for Berwick-on-Tweed where he came close to gaining the seat from the Conservatives.

References

External links 
 

1866 births
1945 deaths
Liberal Party (UK) MPs for English constituencies
UK MPs 1910
UK MPs 1910–1918
UK MPs 1918–1922
UK MPs 1923–1924